Tony Curzon Price is an economist, editor, writer, and entrepreneur.

Price read PPE at Lincoln College, Oxford, and received a PhD in economics from University College London.

From 2007 to 2012, Price served as the editor-in-chief of the British political website openDemocracy. He was the online editor at Intelligence Squared and later worked at the Financial Conduct Authority. Price has written for sites including The Spectator, HuffPost, and the Analysis & Policy Observatory.

From 2016 to 2019, Price was the economic adviser to British politician Greg Clark, who was a Member of Parliament and Secretary of State for Business, Energy and Industrial Strategy.

Tony Curzon Price is the son of Swiss economist Victoria Curzon-Price and economist Gerard Curzon.

References

Living people
British male journalists
British economists
1967 births
Alumni of University College London
Academics of University College London